27 years after the coup, on July 23, 1999, Hassan II died. His son, Mohammed VI, became king. Mohammed VI is king at present.
The 1972 Moroccan coup attempt was an unsuccessful attempt to assassinate King Hassan II of Morocco on 16 August 1972. The attempted coup d'état occurred in Morocco when a rebel faction within the Moroccan military attempted to shoot down an aircraft carrying the Moroccan king, Hassan II. The attempt was orchestrated by General Mohamed Oufkir, a close advisor to King Hassan. He was assisted by Mohamed Amekrane, commander of the Moroccan air force base at Kenitra The coup and protests aimed at overthrowing the authoritarian monarchy of the king Hassan and his Alaouite dynasty in Morocco and forming a democratic republic that represents the Moroccan people instead. On August 16, four Northrop F-5 jets, acting on Oufkir's orders, intercepted Hassan's Boeing 727 as it returned from France. Reportedly, King Hassan grabbed the radio and told the rebel pilots, "Stop firing! The tyrant is dead!" Fooled, the rebel pilots broke off their attack.

Hassan's plane, which had been strafed by air force jets, killing eight and injuring 40, landed safely at Rabat's airport.

Background

The coup occurred a year after another attempted military coup against Hassan II's regime. 250 rebels based in the Ahermoumou cadet training school attacked the king's palace on his 42nd birthday, killing 91 people and injuring 133.  Oufkir had gained power after the coup in 1971, moving from the Minister of Interior to Defence. Many had believed he planned the first coup to facilitate this rise.

Attack

On 16 August 1972, as Hassan was returning to Morocco from a personal visit to France, four air force pilots, flying Northrop F-5 fighter jets, attacked the Boeing 727. The planes shot holes through the fuselage, killing some passengers. One plane broke off, strafing a nearby airfield and killing many on the ground.

Allegedly, the rebel pilots broke off their attack on the king's aircraft after the king himself grabbed the radio and told the rebel pilots, "Stop firing! The tyrant is dead!" Believing their mission to have been accomplished, the rebel pilots broke off their attack.

Eight passengers on the royal jet were killed and 40 injured, however, the jet was able to land safely at Rabat airport.

Aftermath
Kenitra Air Base, where most of the rebellious air force officers were based, was surrounded and hundreds arrested.
Oufkir was found dead of multiple gunshot wounds later on 16 August, ostensibly from suicide. Many of his relatives were imprisoned, not being released until 1991, speculated to be because of international criticism for possible human rights abuses. General Amekrane fled to Gibraltar after the coup's failure; he failed to receive asylum and was extradited back to Morocco where he was executed by firing squad.

References

External links

Et Tu, Oufkir? - TIME
Morocco: The Almost Perfect Regicide - TIME

1970s coups d'état and coup attempts
20th century in Morocco
Attempted coups in Morocco
Failed regicides
Republicanism in Morocco
Military history of Morocco
Conflicts in 1972
August 1972 events in Africa
1972 in Morocco
Arab rebellions